Orting High School is a high school located in Orting, Washington that serves students from grades 9–12 in the Orting and surrounding areas. The mascot is the Cardinal, and the Orting Cardinals was a member of the Nisqually League. OHS is now part of the SPSL 2A league.

Layout
The school has 2 floors each with 11 rooms. It has a student commons, a library, 2 computer labs, and only 2 staircases (one on each side of the school). There are 9 portables to the right of the school. There is also a West Wing, a separate building with one hallway and 8 classrooms. The gym is a walk away from the school in a separate building.
Included among these buildings is three parking lots. Teachers, Students, and a second student parking lot closer to the school.

History
The first graduating class of Orting High School was in 1911.  There was only one student to graduate that year.

Orting High was built in its current location in 1988,  previous location had been built in 1951.

Many of Orting High School alumni and recently graduated students have enlisted in the United States Marine Corps, leading to Orting being the high school with the most Marine alumni in Pierce County. However, as of recent years the number of students enlisting in the Marine Corps has declined steadily.

Notable alumni
Casey Carrigan - Olympic pole vaulter
Ian Shoemaker - College football coach

Sports

References

High schools in Pierce County, Washington
Public high schools in Washington (state)